Sainthia Assembly constituency is an assembly constituency in Birbhum district in the Indian state of West Bengal. It is reserved for scheduled castes.

Overview
As per orders of the Delimitation Commission, No. 289, Sainthia Assembly constituency (SC) is composed of the following: Sainthia municipality, Banagram, Deriapur, Fulur, Horisara, Hatora and Mathpalsa gram panchayats of Sainthia CD Block, Angar Garia, Bhutura, Charicha, Mohammad Bazar, Deucha and Puranagram gram panchayats of Mohammad Bazar CD Block, and Suri II CD Block.

Sainthia Assembly constituency (SC) is part of No. 42 Birbhum (Lok Sabha constituency).

Election results

2021
In the 2021 elections, Nilabati Saha of Trinamool Congress defeated her nearest rival, Piya Saha of BJP.

2016
In the 2016 elections, Nilabati Saha of Trinamool Congress defeated her nearest rival, Dhiren Bagdi of CPI (M).

2011
In the 2011 elections, Dhiren Bagdi of CPI(M) defeated his nearest rival, Parikshit Bala of Trinamool Congress.

 

.# Swing calculated on Congress+Trinamool Congress vote percentages taken together, as well as the CPI(M) vote percentage that year, for the now-defunct Mahammad Bazar constituency in 2006.

References

Assembly constituencies of West Bengal
Politics of Birbhum district